John Howard Gallagher Jr. (born June 17, 1984) is an American actor and musician best known for originating the role of Moritz Stiefel in the 2006 rock musical Spring Awakening, which earned him a Tony Award for Best Featured Actor in a Musical. He also played Johnny in Green Day's Broadway musical, American Idiot, Lee in the 2011 Broadway production of Jerusalem, and Edmund in the 2016 Broadway revival of Long Day's Journey Into Night. He portrayed Jim Harper in Aaron Sorkin's drama series The Newsroom, starred in the HBO mini-series Olive Kitteridge, and played Emmett DeWitt in 10 Cloverfield Lane.

Early life
Gallagher was born in Wilmington, Delaware, and was raised there with his two older sisters. His parents, John and June Gallagher, are folk musicians. He attended Brandywine High School. He eventually went on to play in numerous bands, including Not Now Murray, What Now, Annie's Autograph, and Old Springs Pike. Gallagher played Tom Sawyer as a child actor at the Delaware Children's Theatre.

Before and throughout his Spring Awakening run, he was in the folk-rock group Old Springs Pike. On January 23, 2008, his fellow band members announced his departure. The next day, Gallagher made an official announcement confirming his departure on his MySpace page. Old Springs Pike later officially changed their name to the Spring Standards.

Stage career

2000–2005: Early career 
Gallagher has appeared in three plays by playwright David Lindsay-Abaire. He originated the role of Jeff in Abaire's hit play Kimberly Akimbo, appeared in the ill-fated United Kingdom production of Fuddy Meers, and he received critical acclaim for his role in Rabbit Hole, which marked his Broadway debut. He also appeared in the Manhattan Theatre Club Production of the David Marshall Grant play Current Events.

2006–2011: Broadway and Spring Awakening 
Gallagher originated the role of Moritz Stiefel in Spring Awakening on Broadway after performing the role Off-Broadway and in workshops at Lincoln Center. The rock musical, with music by Duncan Sheik and a book and lyrics by Steven Sater premiered Off-Broadway at the Atlantic Theatre Company on May 19, 2006, and ran through August 5, 2006. Spring Awakening opened on Broadway at the Eugene O'Neill Theatre on December 10, 2006. Gallagher won the 2007 Tony Award for Best Performance by a Featured Actor in a Musical for his performance. On December 16, 2007, he left Spring Awakening and was succeeded two days later by Blake Bashoff.

Gallagher starred in productions of the dramas, Port Authority, by Conor McPherson and Farragut North by Beau Willimon. Both plays were productions of the Atlantic Theater Company, the same theater that premiered Spring Awakening.

Gallagher starred in American Idiot, a musical based on the Green Day album of the same name, along with fellow Spring Awakening alumni Brian Charles Johnson and Gerard Canonico. American Idiot premiered in Berkeley, California at the Berkeley Repertory Theater on September 4, 2009. The show's run ended on November 15, 2009. It began previews on Broadway at the St. James Theatre March 24, 2010 and officially opened on April 20, 2010. It was later nominated for three 2010 Tony Awards, of which it won two. Gallagher played Johnny, or "Jesus of Suburbia". Gallagher departed American Idiot on February 27, 2011, and was succeeded by Van Hughes The show's run ended on April 24, 2011.

After leaving American Idiot, Gallagher was featured in the Broadway production of The Royal Court Theatre's Jerusalem. The production was directed by Ian Rickson, and opened on April 21, 2011, at the Music Box Theatre (239 West 45th Street). He played the role of Lee until leaving the production on July 17, 2011.

2016–present: Return to stage acting 
He starred as Edmund Tyrone in Roundabout Theatre Company's revival of Eugene O'Neill's Long Day's Journey into Night, alongside Jessica Lange and Gabriel Byrne. The show was directed by Jonathan Kent and opened on April 19, 2016, at the American Airlines Theatre.

In 2022, he starred in the world premiere production of Swept Away at the Berkeley Repertory Theatre. Based on the music of The Avett Brothers, the musical reunited Gallagher with Spring Awakening director Michael Mayer. Of note, Gallagher named the Avett Brothers his favorite band in a 2007 New York magazine article.

Film and television work
Gallagher has appeared in several television programs, including The West Wing, Law & Order: SVU, NYPD Blue, Ed, Love Monkey, and Hallmark Hall of Fame's film The Flamingo Rising. He played Jim Harper in Aaron Sorkin's The Newsroom which aired on HBO. He also appeared in HBO's mini-series Olive Kitteridge, based on the Pulitzer-winning novel of the same name, in the role of Christopher Kitteridge.

Gallagher's film credits include Pieces of April, Woody Allen's Whatever Works, Jonah Hex, The Heart Machine, Kenneth Lonergan's Margaret, and a lead role in Short Term 12 opposite Brie Larson. Short Term 12's director, Destin Daniel Cretton described Gallagher as having an innate quality, that the actor "feels like a big brother anyone would want to have."  In 2016, he starred in the thriller film 10 Cloverfield Lane. As of June 2015, he filmed The Belko Experiment, a horror thriller film directed by Greg McLean and written by James Gunn. In 2016, Gallagher starred as the antagonist in horror-thriller film Hush. In 2018 he starred in The Miseducation of Cameron Post, and in 2020 he played Liam Dempsey Jr. in season 3 of Westworld.

Music
Gallagher has been writing music since his early adolescent years, playing guitar, bass, drums and harmonica. He frequently performs in live spaces such as Rockwood Music Hall in New York. On January 15, 2016, Gallagher released his debut album "Six Day Hurricane" via Rockwood Music Hall Recordings, under the name Johnny Gallagher. The album was recorded in Brooklyn in 2012, over the course of six days during Hurricane Sandy. Regarding the decision to release his music after a three-year delay, Gallagher said: "I knew I had to do it now, or I was going to go another year or see another birthday without putting my music out, and I can't live with that." The album, produced by close friend and collaborator Thad DeBrock, includes nine songs originally selected for a previous live performance, including singles "Two Fists Full," "Dangerous Strangers," and "Sarasota Someone."

Filmography

Theater

Awards and nominations

References

External links
 
 
 
 
 Review of John Gallagher Jr's performance in American Idiot on Broadway, April 21, 2010

1984 births
Living people
Male actors from Wilmington, Delaware
21st-century American male actors
American male film actors
American male stage actors
American male musical theatre actors
American male television actors
Musicians from Wilmington, Delaware
Tony Award winners
Singers from Delaware